Shreepur may refer to:

Shreepur, Mahottari, in the Janakpur Zone of south-eastern Nepal
Shreepur, Sarlahi, in the Janakpur Zone of south-eastern Nepal
Shreepur, Maharashtra in Malshiras Taluka in India

See also
 Sripur (disambiguation)